The following highways are numbered 791:

United States